Royal Military Academy may refer to:

 Royal Military Academy, Woolwich,  a British Army academy established in 1741 and closed in 1939
 Royal Military Academy Sandhurst, a British Army academy established in 1947
 Royal Military Academy (Belgium), the military university of Belgium
 Meknes Royal Military Academy, Morocco
 Koninklijke Militaire Academie, the Army and Air Force university of the Netherlands
 Chulachomklao Royal Military Academy, Thailand
 Royal Military Academy, now Military Academy Karlberg, Sweden

See also
Royal Military College (disambiguation)

Educational institution disambiguation pages